Pont d'Iéna ("Jena Bridge") is a bridge spanning the River Seine in Paris. It links the Eiffel Tower on the Left Bank to the district of Trocadéro on the Right Bank.

History

In 1807, by an imperial decree issued in Warsaw, Napoleon I ordered the construction of a bridge overlooking the Military School, and named the it after his victory in 1806 at the Battle of Jena, disregarding other names considered previously: pont du Champ-de-Mars and pont de l'École militaire.

Talleyrand later had the bridge reverted to its original name under Louis-Philippe.

The structure was designed with five arches, each with an arc length of 28 m, and four intermediate piers. The initial construction, the cost of which was enormous at the time, was fully financed by the State and spanned six years from 1808 to 1814.

The tympana along the sides of the bridge had been originally decorated with imperial eagles conceptualized by François-Frédéric Lemot and sculpted by Jean-François Mouret. The eagles were replaced with the royal letter "L" soon after the fall of the First Empire in 1815 but in 1852, when Napoléon III ascended the throne of the Second Empire, new imperial eagles, this time by the chisel of Antoine-Louis Barye, replaced the royal "L".

Put in place in 1853, on the two ends of the bridge, are four sculptures sitting on top of four corresponding pylons: a Gallic warrior by Antoine-Augustin Préault and a Roman warrior by Louis-Joseph Daumas by the Right Bank; an Arab warrior by Jean-Jacques Feuchère and a Greek warrior by François-Théodore Devaulx by the Left Bank.

Towards the second half of the 19th century, the inadequacy of the bridge's carrying capacity started to become a pronounced problem. With the increasing traffic resulting from the expansion of the districts of Trocadéro, Auteuil and Passy, the necessity to enlarge the structure (the width of which was no more than 14 m, including the pavements) in a durable fashion grew as time went on.

Not until 1937, with the prospect of the upcoming World Fair drawing closer, did the French government decide to execute the project, which was all the more necessary as the structure was starting to show sure signs of deterioration. As well as the widening operation, reduced to just 35 meters from the planned 40 meters, the project also transformed the bridge with two additional concrete elements placed at either end, joining to the existing bridge with metal girders. Stone facings were used to protect the concrete tympana, the imperial eagles put back in place and the four statues repositioned accordingly during the bridge expansion.

This bridge has been part of the supplementary registry of historic monuments since 1975.

The steps leading off the bridge are popularly known among film fans as the "Renault stairs", as they featured in a scene in A View to a Kill where James Bond (played by Roger Moore) drove a hijacked Renault 11 taxi down the steps in pursuit of an assassin later revealed to be May Day (Grace Jones).

Gallery

Access

References

External links

  Bridge history
 Technical Specifications

Bridges over the River Seine in Paris
Bridges completed in 1814
Buildings and structures in the 7th arrondissement of Paris
Buildings and structures in the 16th arrondissement of Paris